Charon Virginia Asetoyer (née Huber, born March 24, 1951) is a Comanche activist and women's health advocate. Asetoyer is one of the founders of the Native American Community Board (NACB) and the Native American Women's Health Education Resource Center (NAWHERC). President Clinton appointed her to the National Advisory Council for Health and Human Services (HHS). She has been awarded the Woman of Vision award by the Ms. Foundation and the United Nations Distinguished Services Award.

Biography 
Charon Asetoyer was born on March 24, 1951 in San Jose, California to a Comanche mother and father of European descent. She has been no stranger to activism and hardship, even in her young high school days. Asetoyer's first formulation of strategic protesting occurred in her high school cafeteria, where she staged a school-wide sit in as a way to protest the existing food conditions and demand a hot-lunch program. Her attempts worked and by the end of the week her school had implemented new lunch arrangements that met the desired standards.

Fashion and women's beauty also had a profound impact on Asetoyer's young life; as a young entrepreneur, she started her own dress company from her home, and she later dropped out of high school in order to expand her business. Asetoyer referred to herself as "creative, independent, and an entrepreneur" and noted that she learned more in the coffee shops and streets of California than she would have in the halls of her high school. She moved to San Francisco and successfully ran her own dress shop until 1971 when she closed the boutique in order to enroll in San Francisco City College.

San Francisco brought important elements into Asetoyer's life, including more activist opportunities and her marriage to Dennis Duncan. Her marriage to Dennis Duncan, officially initiated in 1972, led her into her first job that merged her activist work and women's health care; she worked as a WIC program leader and counselor at the Urban Indian Health Clinic in SF's financial district. Her job was one of the only beneficial things to come from her marriage to Duncan, his abusive nature led her to end their relationship in 1977 and resultantly compelled her to move out of California.

Asetoyer relocated to Sioux Falls, South Dakota in 1977, and she enrolled in the University of South Dakota, where she matriculated from in 1981 with a bachelor's degree in criminal justice. 1981 was a monumental year for Charon, alongside college graduation, she married Yankton Sioux tribe member Clarence Rockboy, and migrated again, this time to Brattleboro, Vermont. While in the American Northeast, Asetoyer significantly expanded her education and her family. First, she gave birth to her first child, a boy named Chaska (American version is Charles). After Chaska's birth, the couple also adopted Clarence's abandoned nephew, Reynold James Brugier. Alongside maintaining a growing nuclear family, Asetoyer obtained a dual master's degree in 1983 for Management and Intercultural Administration from Vermont's School for International Training.

Their time in Vermont was short lived. Abiding by Yankton Sioux tradition, the family returned to Sioux Falls, South Dakota in 1983 following the death of Clarence's father. Clarence was to serve a four-year sentence at the reservation in order to fulfill a cultural and religious memorial commitment after his father's passing. The return to Sioux Falls indicates the essential beginning of Charon Asetoyer's activist and political career.

In-depth activist work 
Her work in California and her own abusive marriage pushed Charon Asetoyer to help more dislocated women, specifically Natives. In the early 1970s, the American Indian Movement (AIM) coordinated a walk from Canada and across the United States as a way to protest the forced sterilization of Native women by the government, and this caught the eye of Asetoyer, the young activist. The Indian Health Services, operating under the US government, had been estimated to have sterilized 25% of Native women age 15 to 44 in the late 1970s, without consent from the women or proper education given to them. AIM was a general effort to protest general treatment of Native Americans. In 1978, Asetoyer and many other women involved in AIM joined forces and sought to reconstruct and modernize women's role in the Native community, giving them back some independence within the family unit and in regard to their own healthcare. This group of more than 300 women separated themselves from the American Indian Movement in order to create a more specific group solely for women. These empowered women formed the group known as Women of All Red Nations.

Charon Asetoyer's first activist organization was Women of All Red Nations, commonly abbreviated as WARN, and Asetoyer was the brain behind the business of this operation. Asetoyer created a subdivision of WARN that focused on women's healthcare. Generally, WARN aligned itself with the American Indian Movement that was growing throughout the American 1980s. WARN's objectives initially sought out to help Native American women that were underrepresented in society. Under Asetoyer's leadership of her branch, the organization's intentions generally targeted women's health and pregnancy issues that were prevalent on the Sioux Falls reservation, two of the most prominent being fetal alcohol syndrome and forced sterilization.

Asetoyer's strong willed personality clashed with the politics of WARN, and in 1985, she abandoned the organization, and her own branch, in order to form a more meaningful program that operated precisely how she wanted it to. With the help of her husband Clarence Rockboy, Everdale Songhawk, Jackie Rouse, and Lorenzo Dion, the Native American Community Board (NACB) was born in Rockboy and Asetoyer's basement of their family home in Lake Andes, SD. The NACB started out with a broad mission and intended to help out Natives on the reservation and in the area with any problem they encountered.

The NACB planned out certain campaigns in order to bring awareness to issues in the community, and their first project was centered around what Asetoyer worked on at WARN- fetal alcohol syndrome. "I wanted to get serious about this work. I felt that it was an issue that was plaguing our communities and that we really needed to get a handle on it." By examining the causes of fetal alcohol syndrome, the NACB focused on educational initiatives for young mothers that would lead to better lives for mom and child alike. As Asetoyer and the NACB embarked on this journey to try and transform life on the Yankton Sioux Reservation in South Dakota, they uncovered even more issues among the community. While simultaneously working on the fetal alcohol syndrome objectives, Asetoyer was revamping the general knowledge of women in the area.

Creation of the Native American Women's Health Education Resource Center 
Through conferences and seminars, Asetoyer worked to spread the word about acknowledging the issues at hand, preventative ideology, elements for treatment, and simply about the fundamental components that would increase the standard of living within the Native American community. By spreading awareness, she met other like-minded individuals that were also seeking change. Charon Asetoyer envisioned a designated center that would provide information and assistance in regard to the feminine and reproductive health of Native American Women, and in 1988, her dream became a reality with the creation of the Native American Women's Health Educational Resource Center (NAWHERC) where she was named executive director. "NACB established NAWHERC to provide ongoing comprehensive community health education among Native Americans and to impact policy issues that affect indigenous women nationally and internationally." While creating NAWHERC, Asetoyer drew much inspiration from the National Black Women's Health Imperative after visiting their headquarters in Atlanta, Georgia.

NAWHERC embarked on attacking a wide range of issues within the Native American female community, focusing primarily on elements relating to domestic violence and reproductive health.2 By the end of 1988, NAWHERC's success was adamant. It had already established a domestic violence outpost for victims and survivors, an extensive list of reproductive health programs, information on environmental safety elements, Native American cultural preservation, and was intently circulating literature in relation to AIDs symptoms, treatment, and prevention following the crisis that took place earlier in the decade. NAWHERC was the first organization in South Dakota to actively discuss the treatment and prevention of AIDs. The Native American Women's Health Educational Research Center revolutionized life in Sioux Falls with the help of Charon Asetoyer's leadership. As the center grew, it became known for its profound influence in leading Native women's health initiatives and community learning.

Today, the NAWHERC branch functions as the primary headquarters for NACB activism. As time went on, NAWHERC vastly expanded their list of services to include things like general help forums (alcoholics anonymous, narcotics anonymous, etc.), more treatment centers for a variety of issues, more extensive health screening to involve prevalent concerns like breast cancer, nutritional services for children and adults, childcare services, and even more critical interests.  Domestic situations are still one of the center's top priorities and NAWHERC seeks to bring attention to the rampant domestic abuse in Native families. NAWHERC sponsors a group where women can come together and share their experiences with one another on the topic, provide advice and information, and alert women of the safe spaces and shelters they offer; the center attentively pushes a 'woman's right to leave' campaign and extends help in a multitude of areas to assist women in escaping these detrimental and harmful situations. The center also makes sure that the voices of these women are heard, not just in the community, but at the state and national level as well."NAWHERC's work has resulted in policy changes such as improvements in informed consent, the provision of patients with results for abnormal pap tests and mammograms, treatment for HIV+ patients, patient confidentiality, and the discontinuation of Norplant."

Recent work 
Alongside her establishment and running of NAWHERC, Asetoyer actively participates in women's rights conventions and she travels extensively to speak around the world. Asetoyer tried to continue her hand in politics throughout the early 2000s by running for Mayor of Lake Andes and state senate in two separate elections, but all attempts were unsuccessful. In the mid 2000s, she campaigned against gerrymandering in South Dakota and how polling centers actively prevented Natives from voting. In 2004, a polling place in Lake Andes, SD on the Yankton Sioux Tribe had an illegitimate sign that said in order to vote, a valid photo ID was required. Charon Asetoyer stood up against this injustice with the proof that it was not legal to require an ID and that there were government-accepted alternate documents, especially because Natives living in Yankton Sioux did not have IDs. Asetoyer claimed that poll workers were being force-fed incorrect information in order to cancel the Native vote, and at least twenty one Native Americans were turned away from the polls in just that location. Asetoyer and the community outcry gained the attention of South Dakota's Secretary of State, Chris Nelson. Nelson adamantly agreed with Asetoyer and set out on an initiative to educate poll workers and higher-ups authorities at the polls.

More on the outside realm of politics, she has spoken at the World Conference for Human Rights, in front of the United Nations, and directly to US presidents. "Charon has also influenced political change at the federal level. President Clinton appointed her to serve on the National Advisory Council for Health and Human Services (HHS), and she has served on the National Environmental Justice Advisory Committee of the Environmental Protection Agency (EPA)." She works now to reverse the anti-abortion stance of South Dakota and identifies as a pro-woman, pro-choice democrat and still searches for political activist work.

Alongside her political strides in the democratic community, the Native American women still remain at the top of Charon Asetoyer's priority list. Asetoyer published the book Indigenous Women's Health Book within the Sacred Circle: Reproductive Rights, Environmental Health, Traditional Herbs and Remedies in 2003, naming the author as NAWHERC so proceeds benefit her organization. The Indigenous Women's Health Book revolutionized knowledge and accessibility for the named women because it was the very first book to address the reproductive issues and feminine health of indigenous women. Charon Asetoyer has received numerous awards throughout her forty plus years of feminist activism for the Native American community, but her notable distinctions and accolades aren't stopping her anytime soon; Asetoyer says there is still an extensive amount of work that needs to be done in so many areas of focus.

Charon Asetoyer learned the power of collective uniting at a young age with her in-school protest, and her own experiences as a woman pushed her to help the Native women in need. Over the span of her continuous career, Asetoyer has touched the hearts and lives of countless Native American women by standing up for their rights, protecting them, and giving them a feminist icon to look up to. Through her multitude of organizations, she has revolutionized living and health conditions for female Natives that may never have happened without her perseverance, even in the face of opposition.

Writings

NAWHERC

Journal articles and book chapters

References

Citations

Sources

External links 
 Profile on SheSource
 Interview (NBC news)
 Oral history interview (Smith College, 2005)
 Charon Asetoyer papers, at the Sophia Smith Collection, Smith College.

1951 births
University of South Dakota alumni
SIT Graduate Institute alumni
Comanche people
American women's rights activists
Native American activists
People from San Jose, California
Living people
Activists from the San Francisco Bay Area
People from Charles Mix County, South Dakota
Activists from South Dakota
20th-century Native American women
20th-century Native Americans
21st-century Native American women
21st-century Native Americans